= Khaled Al-Ansari =

Qatari footballer (born 1989)

Personal information
- Full name: Khaled Ahmed Al-Ansari
- Date of birth: 4 January 1989 (age 37)
- Place of birth: , Qatar
- Height: 1.81 m (5 ft 11 1/2 in)
- Position: Midfielder

Senior career*
Years	Team	Apps	(Gls)
2011–2015	Qatar		
2015–2017	Al Ahli		
2018–2019	Al-Shamal		
- * Club domestic league appearances and goals

Khaled Al-Ansari (Arabic: خالد الأنصاري; born 4 January 1989) is a Qatari footballer who plays as a midfielder.
